Pierre-Luc Dusseault (born May 31, 1991) is a Canadian politician who was elected to the House of Commons of Canada in the 2011 federal election at the age of 19, becoming the youngest Member of Parliament in the country's history. He was sworn into office two days after his 20th birthday. He was re-elected in 2015 but lost his seat in the 2019 Canadian federal election.

Early life and education 
Born in Granby, Quebec, and educated in Magog, Dusseault is the son of a daycare administrator and a customer service manager. He received a DEC diploma in social studies from Cégep de Sherbrooke.

Dusseault was a first-year student studying applied politics at the Université de Sherbrooke at the time of his election as an MP. He was the co-founder and president of the university's student NDP club, having joined the NDP in 2009. He has told the press he would like to finish the degree once his political career is over.

2011 election
Dusseault turned 20 two days before the 41st Parliament was sworn in.

He was elected in the same election as five McGill University students, fellow NDP MPs Charmaine Borg, Matthew Dubé, Mylène Freeman, Laurin Liu, and Jamie Nicholls, following the NDP's unexpected mid-campaign surge in Quebec.

Dusseault voted for the first time in this election and had originally planned to work a summer job at a golf course but served in Parliament instead. In parliament, he served as the chair of the access to information, privacy and ethics committee.

2015 election
Dusseault retained his seat at the 2015 general election, one of 17 NDP candidates elected in Quebec. He remained the youngest MP at the start of the 42nd Parliament.

Quebec sovereignty
Three days after the 2011 election, Toronto radio host John Oakley conducted an interview with Dusseault, who drew himself into the debate on the Quebec sovereignty movement by stating, "Sovereignty will be done in Quebec. And Quebecers will decide if they want to be a country." He later clarified his remarks, saying that he was a federalist who respects sovereignty.

Personal
Dusseault, a francophone, stated that he would like to improve his English language skills while in Parliament.

Electoral record

See also
Baby of the House, an unofficial title given to the youngest member of a parliamentary house
Mhairi Black, the youngest British member of parliament since the Great Reform Act of 1832
Alengot Oromait, Africa's youngest ever member of parliament
Wyatt Roy, the youngest ever Australian member of parliament

References

External links 
 Official NDP profile

1991 births
French Quebecers
Living people
Members of the House of Commons of Canada from Quebec
New Democratic Party MPs
People from Granby, Quebec
Politicians from Sherbrooke
Université de Sherbrooke alumni
21st-century Canadian politicians